Neurostrota magnifica is a moth of the family Gracillariidae. It is known from the Galápagos Islands.

References
	 Landry, B. 2006. The Gracillariidae (Lepidoptera, Gracillarioideae) of the Galapagos Islands, Ecuador, with notes on some of their relatives. - Revue suisse de Zoologie 113(3):437–485. (p.474-478)

Gracillariinae